EDSA, Inc. (previously known as Edward Durell Stone, Jr., and Associates) is a planning, landscape architecture, and urban design firm founded in 1960. The company is headquartered in Fort Lauderdale, Florida with offices in Orlando, Florida; Raleigh, North Carolina; New York, New York; Baltimore, Maryland; and Shanghai, China. There are more than 150 employees who represent EDSA and come from a varied range of cultural and ethnic distinctiveness with origins from more than 25 different countries. In addition, their portfolio spans a global range of more than 500 projects in over 100 countries. The firm has been referred to as one of the leading landscape architecture companies in the world. EDSA also considers itself a steward of the land, according to the website, and places sustainability at the forefront of its planning and design efforts.

Services 
EDSA's service offerings include:

 Visioning and Planning: Data Collection, Site Analysis, Opportunity and Feasibility Assessment, Blue Sky Visioning, Storyline Development, Master Plans, Land Use Plans, Regional Planning, Entitlements, Development Guidelines and Strategies.
 Landscape Architecture: Concept Design, Schematic Design, Design Development, Planting Design, Construction / Tender Documents, Permitting, Zoning, Bidding Assistance, Cost Estimating and Construction Observation / Administration.
 Urban Design: Consensus Building Efforts, Downtown Planning, Open Space Design, Pedestrian and Green Zone Development, Streetscape Improvements, Waterfront Revitalization and Historic / Community Preservation.

Offices 
Fort Lauderdale, Florida (Headquarters)
Orlando, Florida
Raleigh, North Carolina
Baltimore, Maryland
New York, New York
Shanghai, China

History 

EDSA was founded in 1960 by American landscape architect Edward Durell Stone, Jr., who collaborated with his father, architect Edward Durell Stone, Sr. to found EDSA.  Stone, Jr. died in 2009 and Douglas C. Smith, who joined the firm in 1987, now serves as president of the company.

In the 1960s, EDSA became an instrumental player in the travel and tourism industries, leading resort and recreation assignments primarily in the Caribbean, Latin America, and the Southeastern United States. During this time, EDSA adopted an environmentally-based design philosophy, which was a relatively obscure notion that takes inspiration from each project's local heritage. A village center form became the framework for housing, amenities, and commerce in order to conserve resources and foster social diversity. This approach became a hallmark of EDSA resorts and communities.

In 1971, EDSA began to receive national recognition when Stone, Jr. was appointed to the Commission of Fine Arts in Washington, D.C. by President Richard Nixon. He served in the position for 12 years. Simultaneously, EDSA's reach was growing on an international level as the firm expanded within the global marketplace. Assignments in the Middle East, Europe, and South America further imbedded the values of sensitivity to local cultures and the importance of collaboration with local professionals.

EDSA broadened its urban design practice with two influential public commissions that reinvigorated Fort Lauderdale's neglected urban waterfronts: The Fort Lauderdale Beach Revitalization in 1986 and Riverwalk Linear Park which was completed in 1994.

In the 1990s, EDSA embarked on planning for several academic institutions including the College of Staten Island and Nova Southeastern University as well as cultural venues like the Florida Nature Cultural Center. A branch office in Orlando began to thrive with several assignments for the Disney Corporation and the new Orlando International Airport.
In 1994, Joseph Lalli became President of EDSA.  Under his leadership, EDSA Orient became the first joint venture landscape architectural office in Beijing, China.  He took the role of Chairman from 2012 until 2014, when he died. Currently, J. Robert Behling holds the role of Chairman.

Notable Projects 
Attractions + Entertainment

 Aquaventure Waterpark, Atlantis the Palm - Dubai, United Arab Emirates 
 DRV Pink Stadium - Fort Lauderdale, Florida 
 Mysterious Rainforest Kingdom - Sanya, China 
 Opera House Downtown Dubai - Dubai, United Arab Emirates 
 Norton Museum of Art - West Palm Beach, Florida

Campus + Healthcare

 Cacacuba, Florida International University - Miami, Florida 
 Instituto Técnico Superior Del Este - Tocumen, Panama 
 Nanjing Medical Center - Nanjing, China 
 Sheikh Zayed Desert Learning Center - Abu Dhabi, United Arab Emirates 
 Sidra Medical and Research Center - Doha, Qatar

Commercial + Mixed-Use

 Bluewaters Island - Dubai, United Arab Emirates 
 FAT Village - Fort Lauderdale, Florida 
 Military Circle - Norfolk, Virginia 
 Port Ba Son - Ho Chi Minh, Vietnam 
 Serena Del Mar - Cartagena, Columbia

Communities & Residential

 Crescent Hills Hot Springs Spa - Xiamen, China 
 John Knox Village - Pompano Beach, Florida 
 Nuevo Samborondon - Samborondon, Ecuador 
 Pont Royal - Aix-en-Provence, France 
 Saltleaf on Estero Bay - Naples, Florida

Hospitality + Tourism

 Etereo Auberge Resort Collection - Quintana Roo, Mexico 
 Four Seasons Hotel Bahrain Bay - Manama, Bahrain 
 Hilton Yuxi Fuxian Lake - Yuxi, China 
 R osewood Castiglion del Bosco - Tuscany, Italy 
 The Boca Raton - Boca Raton, Florida

Parks + Public Realm

 Cairo Central Park - Cairo, Egypt 
 Fort Lauderdale Beach Revitalization - Fort Lauderdale, Florida 
 Owensboro Riverfront - Owensboro, Kentucky 
 Valletta Waterfront - Valletta, Malta 
 Vinhomes Central Park - Ho Chi Minh, Vietnam

Legacy Projects

 El Portal Tropical Rainforest Center - Rio Grande, Puerto Rico 
 John F. Kennedy Center for the Performing Arts - Washington, D.C.
 One & Only Royal Mirage - Dubai, United Arab Emirates 
 PepsiCo World Headquarters - Purchase, New York 
 West Lake Park - Hollywood, Florida

Corporate Structure 

EDSA, Inc. is a privately held company. , the firm is led by Chief Executive Officer, B. Scott LaMont.

Awards & Recognitions 

EDSA has received over 300 industry awards honoring their projects and innovation, some of which include:

 American Society of Landscape Architects, Florida Chapter 
 Escuintla Development Conceptual Master Plan for Progressive Growth | Award of Excellence (2021)
 Hassel Island, a Sustainable Retreat | Award of Excellence (2021)
 Going Beyond Land Use: The Turks and Caicos Islands National Physical Development Plan | Award of Honor (2021)
 Re-Imagining Shanwei Waterfront: An Urban Transformation for Sustainable Growth | Award of Merit (2021)
 Colon Urban Waterfront | Award of Merit (2020)
 Delray Beach Revitalization | Award of Merit (2020)
 Hyatt Andaz at Mayakoba | Award of Honor (2019) 
 Green Wise Headquarters | Frederic B. Stresau Award, Environmental Sustainability Honor and Award of Excellence (2018)
 Sheikh Zayed Desert Learning Center | Award of Honor (2018) 
 Every Hero Has a Story Student Awareness Campaign | Award of Honor (2018)
 Aquatics International 
 Tidal Cover Waterpark | Dream Designs (2021)
 Hytides Waterpark, Hyatt Regency Aruba (2021)
 Glocal Design Magazine 
 Zadun Reserve | Noldi Schreck Awards: 1st Place, Hotel Gran Tourismo (2021)
 Land8 
 Best of Social Media Accounts in Landscape Architecture (2021), (2020)

References 

Landscape architecture
Architecture firms of the United States
Urban planning in the United States
Companies based in Fort Lauderdale, Florida
Design companies established in 1960
1960 establishments in Florida